Noah Knight Green (December 24, 1808May 8, 1886) was a Michigan politician.

Early life
Noah K. Green was born on December 24, 1808, in Windsor, Massachusetts to parents Noah and 	
Sarah Sally Green. In Massachusetts, Noah K. Green received an education and was brought up as a farmer.

Career
Green settled on a farm in Medina Township, Michigan in 1835. On November 5, 1849, Green was elected to the Michigan House of Representatives where he represented the Lenawee County district from January 7, 1850, to April 21, 1850. On November 6, 1860, Green was elected to the Michigan House of Representatives where he represented the Lenawee County 4th district from January 2, 1861, to December 31, 1862. On November 4, 1862, Green was elected to the Michigan House of Representatives where he represented the Lenawee County 1st district from January 7, 1863, to December 31, 1864.

Personal life
Green married Esther Eliza Baldwin on November 5, 1834, in Windsor, Massachusetts. They had at least four children.

Death
Green died on May 8, 1886, in Medina Township. Green is interred at Oak Grove Cemetery in Morenci, Michigan.

References

1808 births
1886 deaths
Burials in Michigan
Farmers from Massachusetts
Farmers from Michigan
People from Berkshire County, Massachusetts
People from Lenawee County, Michigan
Republican Party members of the Michigan House of Representatives
19th-century American politicians